Mehrdasht (formerly, Mehrabad, also Romanized as Mehrābād; also known as Mehr Abad Abarghoo, Mehrābād-e Abrqū, and Mihrābād) is a city in, and the capital of, Bahman District of Abarkuh County, Yazd province, Iran. At the 2006 census, its population was 7,201 in 1,756 households. The following census in 2011 counted 7,390 people in 1,994 households. The latest census in 2016 showed a population of 8,097 people in 2,338 households.

References 

Abarkuh County

Cities in Yazd Province

Populated places in Yazd Province

Populated places in Abarkuh County